Kvarken Bridge is a proposed bridge between Sweden and Finland across the strait of Kvarken as a part of the European route E12. The cost of the bridge has been estimated to about 1.5 to 2 billion euros. The Swedish minister of finance has said it is an interesting idea, but the idea is still decades from being brought to fruition. There is a debate in the coastal cities on both sides, like Umeå in Sweden and Vaasa in Finland. The official view from the Swedish and Finnish governments is that it is far too expensive. The natural values in the area also makes a bridge doubtful. A part of the area is a UNESCO World Heritage Site.

The working group for the bridge has proposed a three-step programme:

 To ensure that there is a ferry connection across the Kvarken. The current connection operated by RG Line is unprofitable.
 To build a ferry harbour on Replot, Korsholm, to shorten the current travel time of 6 hours to about 5.
 To build a bridge across the Kvarken.

The Swedish Västerbotten business owners' association intends to commission a report into the significance of a bridge for the development of the region.

References

Bridges in Finland
Bridges in Sweden
Proposed bridges in Europe
Proposed transport infrastructure
Connections across the Baltic Sea